Palau Blaugrana (meaning in English "Blue and Garnet Palace") is an arena in Barcelona, Catalonia, Spain, belonging to FC Barcelona. The 7,585 seating capacity arena is home to the basketball, handball, roller hockey, and futsal divisions of FC Barcelona. Palau Blaugrana is located between Mini Estadi and the Camp Nou.

There's also an awards showcase and pro-shop inside.

History 

Built in 1971, the stadium originally held 5,696 spectators, but the facility was remodeled in 1994, to fit the current capacity of 7,585. During the 1992 Summer Olympics, the arena hosted several events, including roller hockey, taekwondo and judo. The arena's main court area was renovated in 2016.

Retired numbers 

Several basketball, handball, roller hockey and futsal players have had their jerseys retired:
4 Andrés Jiménez, 7 Nacho Solozábal, 11 Juan Carlos Navarro, 12 Roberto Dueñas and 15 Epi for Basketball 
2 Òscar Grau, 4 Xavier O'Callaghan, 5 Enric Masip, 7 Iñaki Urdangarin, 14 Joan Sagalés and 16 David Barrufet for Handball 
21 Alberto Borregán for Roller Hockey
28 Paco Sedano for Futsal

Nou Palau Blaugrana 

Under Sandro Rosell's presidency, FC Barcelona announced that by 2013, it planned to build a new Palau Blaugrana for its handball and basketball teams, with a capacity of 12,000 seats. Also included in the plan, was a smaller campus with a capacity of 3,000 seats, plus [a special conditions] for hotel partners (operated by a specialist company located on the corner of Aristides Maillol with John XXIII), new parking spaces and an auditorium, with a 2,000 capacity, for the foundation, including the offices of the club. These plans, however, were later dropped in favour of the Espai Barça project.

Under the Espai Barça project, the current Palau Blaugrana will be demolished, and a new arena is expected to be built on the site previously occupied by the Mini Estadi, which was demolished to make way for the new arena. Work is expected to start by the 2017–18 basketball season. The Nou Palau Blaugrana will have a capacity of about 12,500 people with an adjacent, smaller court that will seat approximately 2,000. Additionally, the New Palau will have 24 VIP boxes and 4 sky bars with court views.

See also 

 FC Barcelona (Main body and football club)
 FC Barcelona Bàsquet (basketball)
 FC Barcelona Handbol (handball)
 FC Barcelona Hoquei (roller hockey)
 FC Barcelona Futsal (futsal)
 FC Barcelona-Institut Guttman (wheelchair basketball)
 UB-Barça (Women's basketball)

References

External links 

Palau Blaugrana at fcbarcelona.com

FC Barcelona
FC Barcelona Bàsquet
FC Barcelona Handbol
FC Barcelona Hoquei
FC Barcelona Futsal
Venues of the 1992 Summer Olympics
Olympic judo venues
Olympic taekwondo venues
Sports venues in Barcelona
Handball venues in Spain
Indoor arenas in Catalonia
Indoor arenas in Spain
Basketball venues in Spain
Buildings and structures completed in 1971
Boxing venues in Spain